The 1981 Cotton Bowl Classic was the 45th edition of the college football bowl game, played at the Cotton Bowl in Dallas, Texas, on Thursday, January 1. Part of the 1980–81 bowl game season, it matched the ninth-ranked Alabama Crimson Tide of the Southeastern Conference (SEC) and the #6 Baylor Bears of the Southwest Conference (SWC). Favored Alabama shut out the Baylor offense and won, 30–2.

Teams

Alabama

Baylor

Game summary
Televised by CBS, the game kicked off shortly after 1 p.m. CST, at the same time as the Sugar Bowl on ABC.

Alabama took a 6–0 lead on a pair of Peter Kim field goals. Baylor responded later in the first quarter with its only points of the game when Tommy Tabor sacked Alabama quarterback Walter Lewis in the end zone for a safety to bring the score to 6–2. The Crimson Tide extended their lead to 13–2 at the half following a one-yard Major Ogilvie touchdown run in the second quarter.

After a third Kim field goal in the third, Alabama closed out the fourth quarter with a pair of touchdowns; Don Jacobs scored on a one-yard run, followed by Mark Nix from three yards out to make the final score 30–2. Alabama linebacker Warren Lyles was named the defensive MVP, and running back Ogilvie took the offensive honors.

Scoring
First quarter
Alabama - Peter Kim 29-yard field goal
Alabama - Kim 27-yard field goal
Baylor - Safety, quarterback Walter Lewis tackled by Tommy Tabor in the end zone
Second quarter
Alabama - Major Ogilvie 1-yard run (Kim kick)
Third quarter
Alabama - Kim 42-yard field goal
Fourth quarter
Alabama - Don Jacobs 1-yard run (Kim kick)
Alabama - Mark Nix 2-yard run (George Mardini kick)

Statistics
{| class=wikitable style="text-align:center"
! Statistics !! Alabama !!  Baylor 
|-
|align=left|First Downs || 17|| 13
|-
|align=left|Rushes–yards|| 67–241|| 35–54
|-
|align=left|Passing yards || 98|| 104
|-
|align=left|Passes || 5–12–0 || 12–27–3
|-
|align=left|Total Offense || 79–339|| 62–158
|-
|align=left|Punts–average ||6–37|| 7–35
|-
|align=left|Fumbles–lost ||5–1|| 5–4
|-
|align=left|Turnovers || 1|| 7
|-
|align=left|Penalties–yards ||5–89|| 6–59
|}

Aftermath
This was the final collegiate game for Baylor's All-American linebacker Mike Singletary, a future College and Pro Football Hall of Famer.

In the final AP poll, Alabama climbed to sixth and Baylor dropped to fourteenth.

References

1980–81 NCAA football bowl games
1981
1981
1981
1981 in sports in Texas
January 1981 sports events in the United States